St. Bernward is a Catholic church and parish in Döhren, part of Hanover, the capital of Lower Saxony, Germany. It was consecrated in 1893 to Bernward of Hildesheim, when part of Christoph Hehl's design of a basilica in Romanesque revival style were built, but was completed after World War II. Major artwork was added for the centenary in 1993. It became the centre of a larger parish in 2010.

History 
The only Catholic church of Hanover then was St. Clemens. In 1887, a Catholic school was built. The present church was designed by Christoph Hehl in Romanesque revival style as a basilica with three naves. In the beginning, only one nave was built, without transept and choir. The missing elements were added in 1959. The church was consecrated on 8 September 1893, dedicated to Saint Bernward. He had become bishop of Hildesheim 900 years earlier, and the consecration was performed by his successor .

The parish grew further. The building survived the bombing of Hanover in World War II with only minor damage to the roof and windows. When the number of Catholics exceeded 8000 in 1955, caused by the arrival of many refugees from Silesia, the church was expanded, finally realising the original plans, with a transept and apse. It was completed in 1960. After the Second Vatican Council of 1962, the altar area was remodelled. 

Organ 
It has 34 stops on two manuals and pedal.

Centenary 
For the centenary in 1993,  created new artworks, including decoration of the apse and the Stations of the Cross. In the apse, he based his work on the oldest icon of Christ, held at Mount Athos. The depiction is accented by golden drapery and steel tubes forming a cross pattern. The stations of the cross are reduced to symbolic basic postures in sparse lines.

Further reading 
Was ist das, St. Bernward?, Festschrift of the parish, 1993
Wolfgang Puschmann: St. Bernwardskirche. In: Hannovers Kirchen. 140 Kirchen in Stadt und Umland. Hermannsburg: Ludwig-Harms-Haus 2005, pp. 12–15.

References

External links 

Churches in Hanover
Churches in the Diocese of Hildesheim
Roman Catholic churches completed in 1893
Romanesque Revival church buildings in Germany